Matthias II may refer to:

Matthias II, Duke of Lorraine (ca. 1193 – 1251)
Pope Matthew II of Alexandria, ruled in 1453–1466
Matthias, Holy Roman Emperor (1557–1619), Holy Roman Emperor, King of Hungary, Croatia and Bohemia